The 2004–2005 Vendée Globe is a non-stop solo Round the World Yacht Race for IMOCA 60 class yachts this is the fifth edition of the race starting on 7 November 2004 from Les Sables-d'Olonne.

Summary
The start of the 2004 race was watched by an estimated 300,000 people, which took place in mild weather. A fast start was followed by a few minor equipment problems, allowing the first racers to cross the equator just after 10 days. This was three days faster than the previous race, with all of the starters still sailing.

Attrition began on entry into the Roaring Forties: Alex Thomson diverted to Cape Town to make unassisted repairs and continue racing. The fleet encountered a number of other problems. Hervé Laurent retired with serious rudder problems, Thomson abandoned, and Conrad Humphreys anchored to make unassisted rudder repairs. Gear problems and abandonments continued, then the fleet ran into an area of ice, and Sébastien Josse hit an iceberg head-on.

The lead changed several times as the fleet re-entered the Atlantic. The race remained close right to the finish, which saw three boats finish within 29 hours.

The first Race Director Denis Horeau returned to the role after 15 years to head the event management team.

Results

Entries

Participants gallery

Participant facts equipment
Twenty skippers started the race a qualification passage was required to validate the registration of each boat, this course could have been carried out as part of another sailing race.

References

External links
 
 Official YouTube Channel
 

Vendée Globe
Vendée Globe
Vendée Globe
Vendée Globe
Vendée Globe